Charles Edward Butterworth (July 26, 1896 – June 14, 1946) was an American actor specializing in comedic roles, often in musicals.   His distinctive voice was the inspiration for the Cap'n Crunch commercials created by the Jay Ward studio: Voice actor Daws Butler based Cap'n Crunch on Butterworth's voice.

Early life
Butterworth was the son of a physician in South Bend, Indiana. He graduated from the University of Notre Dame in 1924 with a law degree.

Career
After graduating, Butterworth became a newspaper reporter at the South Bend News-Times and subsequently Chicago.

One of Butterworth's more memorable film roles was in the Irving Berlin musical This Is the Army (1943) as bugle-playing Private Eddie Dibble. He was generally a supporting actor, though he had top billing in We Went to College (1936) and the title role in Baby Face Harrington (1935), and shared top billing (as the Sultan) with Ann Corio in The Sultan's Daughter (1944). In his obituary, he was described as "characterizing the man who could not make up his mind".

He is credited with the quip "Why don't you slip out of those wet clothes and into a dry martini?" from Every Day's a Holiday. In Forsaking All Others, when Clark Gable, quoting Benjamin Franklin, said, "Early to bed, early to rise, makes a man healthy, wealthy and wise," Butterworth replied, "Ever take a good look at a milkman?"

Death
Butterworth had a home in Palm Springs, California. He was killed in an automobile accident on June 13, 1946, when he lost control of his car on Sunset Boulevard in Los Angeles. He died en route to the hospital.

Legacy
For his contributions to the film industry, Butterworth was posthumously inducted into the Hollywood Walk of Fame in 1960 with a motion pictures star at 7036 Hollywood Boulevard.

Partial filmography

 Vital Subjects (1929, Short)
 Ladies of Leisure (1930) – Party Guest (uncredited)
 The Life of the Party (1930) – Colonel Joy
 Illicit (1931) – Georgie Evans
 The Bargain (1931) – Geoffrey
 Side Show (1931) – Sidney
 The Mad Genius (1931) – Karimsky
 Manhattan Parade (1931) – Herbert T. Herbert
 Beauty and the Boss (1932) – Ludwig Pfeffer Jr.
 Love Me Tonight (1932) – Count de Savignac
 The Nuisance (1933) – Floppy Phil Montague
 Penthouse (1933) – Layton
 My Weakness (1933) – Gerald Gregory
 The Cat and the Fiddle (1934) – Charles
 Hollywood Party (1934) – Harvey Clemp
 Bulldog Drummond Strikes Back (1934) – Algy 'Mousey' Longworth
 Student Tour (1934) – Ethelred Lippincott – Professor of Philosophy
 Forsaking All Others (1934) – Shemp
 The Night Is Young (1935) – Willy Fitch
 Baby Face Harrington (1935) – Willie
 Orchids to You (1935) – Teddy Stuyvesant
 Magnificent Obsession (1935) – Tommy Masterson
 The Moon's Our Home (1936) – Horace Van Steedan
 Half Angel (1936) – Doc Felix
 We Went to College (1936) – Glenn Harvey
 Rainbow on the River (1936) – Barrett
 Swing High, Swing Low (1937) – Harry
 Every Day's a Holiday (1937) – Larmadou Graves
 Thanks for the Memory (1938) – Biney
 Let Freedom Ring (1939) – The Mackerel
 The Boys from Syracuse (1940) – Duke of Ephesus
 Second Chorus (1940) – Mr. Chisholm
 There's Nothing to It (1941)
 Blonde Inspiration (1941) – 'Bittsy' Conway
 Road Show (1941) – Harry Whitman
 Sis Hopkins (1941) – Horace Hopkins
 What's Cookin'? (1942) – J. P. Courtney
 Night in New Orleans (1942) – Edward Wallace
 Give Out, Sisters (1942) – Prof. Woof
 This Is the Army (1943) – Eddie Dibble
 Always a Bridesmaid (1943) – Col. Thaddeus Winchester
 The Sultan's Daughter (1944) – Sultan of Araband
 Follow the Boys (1944) – Louie Fairweather
 Bermuda Mystery (1944) – Dr. Randolph Tilford
 Dixie Jamboree (1944) – Professor (final film role)

References

External links

 
 
 
 

1896 births
1946 deaths
American male film actors
American male musical theatre actors
Male actors from Indiana
Male actors from Palm Springs, California
Road incident deaths in California
20th-century American male actors
20th-century American singers
20th-century American male singers
Notre Dame Law School alumni
Actors from South Bend, Indiana